Wedel is a town in the district of Pinneberg, in Schleswig-Holstein, Germany.

Wedel may also refer to:

 E. Wedel, a Polish confectionery company
 Wedel (surname), a surname
 Wedel station, a railway station on the Altona-Blankenese line
 Wedel (family)

See also
 Weddell (disambiguation)
 Wedel-Jarlsberg